Menaca is a genus of ichneumon wasps in the tribe Limneriini.

References

External links 

 Menaca at insectoid.info

Campopleginae
Ichneumonidae genera